Roger Millward  (16 September 1947 – 2 May 2016) was an English rugby league footballer who played in the 1960s and 1970s, and coached in the 1980s and 1990s. A goal-kicking  , he gained a high level of prominence in the sport in England by playing for Hull Kingston Rovers (captain) and Castleford (Heritage № 483), as well as representing Great Britain. Millward was awarded the Order of the British Empire (MBE) in 1983. Nicknamed “Roger the Dodger” for his elusive running, he was inducted into the Rugby League Hall of Fame in 2000. Millward’s ability placed him in the top bracket of rugby league halves to have ever played the game.

Early life
Millward was born in Castleford, West Riding of Yorkshire, England.

Domestic career 
Millward began his professional career in September 1964, signing for his home town club Castleford. He made his début on 3 October 1964 against Dewsbury Celtic, and won his first domestic honours in 1965 with Castleford picking up the Floodlit Trophy. Millward played in Castleford's victory in the Yorkshire County League during the 1964–65 season. Despite his lack of game experience, the international selectors were interested in Millward and picked him to play for the Great Britain team in March 1966 against France at the age of 18 and one of Great Britain's youngest players.

Millward played  in Castleford's 4–0 victory over St. Helens in the 1965 BBC2 Floodlit Trophy Final during the 1965–66 season at Knowsley Road, St. Helens on Tuesday 14 December 1965.

On 8 August 1966 Millward was transferred from Castleford to Hull Kingston Rovers for a fee of £6,000, (based on increases in average earnings, this would be approximately £185,900 in 2013) and he made his début for Hull Kingston Rovers at Hunslet on 15 August 1966 and helped the club win the Yorkshire County Cup, and retain it in the 1967 season.

In the 1968 season Millward finished as the top try scorer for Hull Kingston Rovers with a total of 38 tries in that season, picking up the supporters' player of the year award. Due to his good form he was awarded a call up to the Great Britain squad for the 1968 World Cup which Britain lost to Australia.

In 1969 at the age of 21 Millward was given the captaincy of Hull Kingston Rovers, and was also voted the supporters' player of the year for the second time as well as being honoured with the title of Rugby League Players No 6 "Player of the Year".

In the mid-1970s Hull Kingston Rovers had become a dominant force in the world of rugby league thanks in part to Millward's playmaking abilities. Although Hull Kingston Rovers were now one of the top clubs in British rugby league the major awards eluded Millward during his career at Hull Kingston Rovers with just two more Yorkshire Cup winner's medals (1971–72, 1974–75) and a runner's up medal (1975–76) along with two more supporters' player of the year awards (1974–75, 1975–76). In Millward's testimonial year he managed to set a new record for Hull Kingston Rovers with the most tries scored in a season, scoring 160 tries in total.

In the 1976 close season Millward decided to go and play for an Australian club, Cronulla-Sutherland. Millward made 14 appearances during his time in Sydney, and scored one try as well as kicking 17 points for the then struggling club before returning to Hull.

In 1977 Millward was named as player-coach of Hull Kingston Rovers after the unfortunate death of the club's former manager Harry Poole. Millward played , and was the coach in Hull Kingston Rovers' 26–11 victory over St. Helens in the 1977 BBC2 Floodlit Trophy Final during the 1977–78 season at Craven Park, Hull on Tuesday 13 December 1977. He was again voted the supporters' player of the season. This then started a period of total domination for Hull Kingston Rovers.

In the 1978–79 season Hull Kingston Rovers were crowned Division One Champions (the first since 1925). In the 1979–80 season Millward and his Hull Kingston Rovers side made it to Wembley to play cross-city rivals Hull F.C. in the Challenge Cup Final, despite breaking his jaw midway through the first half, Millward continued and was awarded the trophy at the end of the game.

Roger Millward played , and was the captain and coach  in Hull Kingston Rovers' 10–5 victory over Hull F.C. in the 1979–80 Challenge Cup Final during the 1979–80 season at Wembley Stadium, London on Saturday 3 May 1980, in front of a crowd of 95,000.

Roger Millward played  in Hull Kingston Rovers' 25–12 victory over Featherstone Rovers in the 1966–67 Yorkshire County Cup Final during the 1966–67 season at Headingley Rugby Stadium, Leeds on Saturday 15 October 1966, played  in the 8–7 victory over Hull F.C. in the 1967–68 Yorkshire County Cup Final during the 1967–68 season at Headingley Rugby Stadium, Leeds on Saturday 14 October 1967, played , and scored 4-conversions in the 11–7 victory over Castleford in the 1971–72 Yorkshire County Cup Final during the 1971–72 season at Belle Vue, Wakefield on Saturday 21 August 1971, played , and was man of the match winning the White Rose Trophy in Hull Kingston Rovers' 16–13 victory over Wakefield Trinity in the 1974–75 Yorkshire County Cup Final during the 1974–75 season at Headingley Rugby Stadium, Leeds on Saturday 26 October 1974, and played , and scored a drop goal in the 11–15 defeat by Leeds in the 1975–76 Yorkshire County Cup Final during the 1975–76 season at Headingley Rugby Stadium, Leeds on Saturday 15 November 1975.

Millward retired from rugby league a year after the historic challenge cup victory whilst playing for Hull Kingston Rovers' A Team against a Batley A Team. This was Millward's return to action after sustaining a broken jaw in the Challenge Cup Final victory but he was hit by a Batley player and sustained another broken jaw, his fourth in ten months. It was his last game.

Millward's Testimonial match at Hull Kingston Rovers took place in 1977.

International career
By 1969, Millward had established himself as a full Great Britain international after his début at 18 years of age playing , in the 4–8 defeat by France at Central Park, Wigan on 5 March 1966, he went on to make 47 appearances for Great Britain, including 29 Tests. Millward went on tour with Great Britain a total of five times and also toured with the England National Team on one occasion, captaining in both World Cup tournaments.

Millward’s international career was important as he was an integral member of Great Britain’s last Ashes winning Tour to Australia in 1970 and the last time any series was won against the Australians.

Millward played in the 1967 Test Series against the Kangaroo tourists in Britain, and the 1968 World Cup, both campaigns being unsuccessful. However, his finest hour as an international came in the Great Britain touring party of 1970. He was overlooked in favour of former Castleford club mate Alan Hardisty for the first Test against the Australians. The Great Britain team was heavily beaten 37–15 and wholesale changes were made for the 2nd Test. Millward was drafted into the side, where he gave a superb match winning performance scoring 20 points (2 tries, 7 goals) in a 28–7 win to square the series. This equalled the match points record for an individual against the Australians, which had previously been set by Lewis Jones.

The third Test decider was also successful and the Ashes regained. The 21–17 score did not reflect Great Britain’s superiority as they scored five tries to one, but were heavily penalised by the referee. Again, Millward rose to the occasion: with approximately five-minutes to go he scored the match and series winning try on the Sydney Cricket Ground (SCG). The try resulted from a thrust through the middle by the second rows, first by Jimmy Thompson, and then a bust by Doug Laughton, who then delivered a brilliant pass to Millward in space; Millward took the pass at pace and in turn then outstripped the opposition defence in an arcing run of over 40-yards to score. He also kicked three goals in the game.

Thereafter, Millward played with distinction for Great Britain in various internationals against the other nations, but a winning series against the Australians proved elusive.

Millward missed the 1970 Rugby League World Cup due to a broken fibula in his left leg. He was named in the Great Britain squad for the 1972 Rugby League World Cup, but later withdrew.

Coaching
After retiring, Millward stayed on the coaching staff at Hull Kingston Rovers throughout the 1980s, and early 1990s, and guided his team to another Challenge Cup Final and the Yorkshire Cup Final in the 1980–81 season, losing both matches but they did manage a Premiership trophy. Millward coached Hull Kingston Rovers to the John Player Trophy Final which they lost and second in the Division One Championship. Millward was later awarded an MBE by the Queen for services to rugby league and sport in Great Britain.

Roger Millward was the coach in Hull Kingston Rovers' 9–18 defeat by Widnes in the 1980–81 Challenge Cup Final during the 1980–81 season at Wembley Stadium, London on Saturday 2 May 1981, in front of a crowd of 92,496, and was the coach in the 14–15 defeat by Castleford in the 1983–84 Challenge Cup Final during the 1984–85 season at Wembley Stadium, London, on Saturday 3 May 1986, in front of a crowd of 82,134.

Roger Millward was the coach in Hull Kingston Rovers' 3–13 defeat by Hull F.C. in the 1979 BBC2 Floodlit Trophy Final during the 1979–80 season at the Boulevard, Hull on Tuesday 18 December 1979.

Roger Millward was the coach in Hull Kingston Rovers' 7–8 defeat by Leeds in the 1980–81 Yorkshire County Cup Final during the 1980–81 season at Fartown, Huddersfield on Saturday 8 November 1980, and was the coach in the 12–29 defeat by Hull F.C. in the 1984–85 Yorkshire County Cup Final during the 1984–85 season at Boothferry Park, Hull on Saturday 27 October 1984.

During the 1983–84 season Hull Kingston Rovers dominated the scene with Millward's leadership, winning the League Championship as well as the Premiership to be the first team to complete the double and were rightfully crowned the 'Rugby League Team of the Year'. The 1984–85 season was almost as historic with victories in the John Player Trophy Final and being crowned Division One Champions for the fifth time, but lost out on the Premiership Final .

In 1984–85 Millward coached his side to the last major final of his tenure. The club were victorious in the Yorkshire Cup Final but were defeated in the John Player Trophy and Challenge Cup Finals which consequently saw the end of Hull Kingston Rovers' domination of English rugby league. Millward left the club after its relegation to Division Two. By 2009 Hull Kingston Rovers had revived its fortunes, riding high in 4th place in the Super League, and regularly fills the new Craven Park, and the Roger Millward Stand.

In 1991 Roger, took the coaching job at Halifax, but was only there 17 months before resigning.

Personal life
Roger Millward's marriage to Carol A. (née Bailey) was registered during third ¼ 1968 in Barkston Ash district, they had children; Kay Millward (birth registered during fourth ¼  in Barkston Ash district), and they lived in Kippax, near Leeds. Millward was most recently employed as a Premises Manager by Royds Specialist Language College, near Rothwell Sports Centre. Despite removing all ties from rugby league after leaving Hull Kingston Rovers he attended rugby league matches, mainly those involving his home town club Castleford. Roger Millward was son of William Millward, and Ivy Lockwood (marriage registered during first ¼ 1939 in Pontefract district), was the younger brother of Roy Millward (birth registered during fourth ¼ 1939 in Pontefract district), and was the cousin of the rugby league footballer, and coach, Brian Lockwood.

In 2007 Millward had an operation to remove a cancerous growth in the jaw.

Legacy
Millward made 406 appearances for Hull Kingston Rovers in total, with 207 tries, over 600 goals and a grand total of 1,825 points making him the third highest points scorer in Hull Kingston Rovers' history. Millward holds the club's record of 207 tries (which beat the previous record set in the 1920s by  Gilbert Austin by nearly 50 tries) and has also scored a total of eleven hat tricks for Hull Kingston Rovers, with one for Castleford and two for Great Britain as well as kicking more than ten goals per match.

Following his death Hull Kingston Rovers retired the number 6 from the team jersey.  A jersey bearing the number was presented to his family at the game against Widnes on 15 May 2016.

In 2016, it was announced that Hull's Garrison Road would be renamed Roger Millward Way, and a renaming ceremony was held in January 2018.

Honours

MBE -1983

Rugby League Ashes Winner - 1970 

Rugby League World Cup R/Up - 1977

Challenge Cup Winner - 1979/80 - Player-Coach (R/Up - 1980/81 - Coach, 1985/86 - Coach)

Rugby League Championship Winner 1978/79 - Player-Coach, 1983/84 - Coach, 1984/85 - Coach (R/Up - 1967/68, 1982/83 - Coach)

John Player Trophy Winner 1984/85 - Coach (R/Up 1981/82 - Coach, 1985/86 - Coach)

Rugby League Premiership Trophy - 1980/81 - Coach, 1983/84 - Coach (R/Up - 1984/85 - Coach)

BBC2 Trophy - 1965/66, 1977/78 - Player-Coach (R/Up - 1979/80 - Player-Coach) 

Yorkshire Cup - 1966/67, 1967/68, 1971/72, 1974/75, 1985/86 - Coach (R/Up- 1975/76, 1980/81 - Coach, 1984/85 - Coach)

Division Two Championship - 1989/90 - Coach (R/Up - 1974/75)

Rugby League Hall of Fame - 2000 

Rugby League Coach of The Year - 1985

Players No.6 RL Player of The Year - 1969

Hull KR Player of The Year - 1968, 1969, 1975, 1976, 1978

White Rose Trophy - 1975

Hull KR Record Try Scorer (1966-1980) 207 Tries

List of Hull Kingston Rovers players - Heritage No 700

Accolades

Open Rugby inaugural World XIII
The Open Rugby inaugural World XIII was revealed in June 1978, it was; Graham Eadie, John Atkinson, Steve Rogers, Jean-Marc Bourret, Green Vigo, Roger Millward, Steve Nash, Jim Mills, Keith Elwell, Steve Pitchford, Terry Randall, George Nicholls and Greg Pierce.

Honoured by Arriva Yorkshire
Arriva Yorkshire honoured 13 rugby league footballers on Thursday 20 August 2009, at a ceremony at Wheldon Road, the home of Castleford. A fleet of new buses were named after the 'Arriva Yorkshire Rugby League Dream Team'. Members of the public nominated the best ever rugby league footballers to have played in West Yorkshire, supported by local rugby league journalists; James Deighton from BBC Leeds, and Tim Butcher, editor of Rugby League World. The 'Arriva Yorkshire Rugby League Dream Team' is; Trevor Foster MBE, Neil Fox MBE, Albert Goldthorpe, Alan Hardisty, Stan Kielty, Lewis Jones, Roger Millward MBE, Malcolm Reilly, Garry Schofield, Keith Senior, David Topliss, Dave Valentine and Adrian Vowles.

References

External links
(archived by archive.is) Roger Millward at rugbyleaguehistory.co.uk
(archived by web.archive.org) Roger Millward at rlhalloffame.org.uk
(archived by web.archive.org) Roger Millward at eraofthebiff.com

(archived by web.archive.org) Kangaroos beat Lions at Wilderspool
 (archived by web.archive.org) Hull Kingston Rovers ~ Captains

1947 births
2016 deaths
Castleford Tigers players
Cronulla-Sutherland Sharks players
England national rugby league team captains
England national rugby league team players
English rugby league coaches
English rugby league players
Great Britain national rugby league team captains
Great Britain national rugby league team players
Halifax R.L.F.C. coaches
Hull Kingston Rovers captains
Hull Kingston Rovers coaches
Hull Kingston Rovers players
Members of the Order of the British Empire
People from Kippax, West Yorkshire
Rugby league five-eighths
Rugby league halfbacks
Rugby league wingers
Rugby league players from Castleford
York Wasps coaches
Yorkshire rugby league team players